Robert Reimann (17 December 1911 – 28 August 1987) was a Swiss politician, member of the federal parliament (1955–1979) and President of the Swiss Council of States in 1977/1978.

External links 
 

1911 births
1987 deaths
Members of the Council of States (Switzerland)
Presidents of the Council of States (Switzerland)
Christian Democratic People's Party of Switzerland politicians